Seven Deadly Sins Four Deadly Sinners is an anthology-style play compiled and written by Carry On... writer Norman Hudis and producer Marc Sinden, who is also the director. It was originally devised by Sinden as a female rival to the RSC's The Hollow Crown and was the first anthology to have a permanent 'pool' of actresses from which four appear for the performance.

It has toured in the UK since 15 June 2003 (premiering at the Princess Theatre, Hunstanton, Norfolk) and is produced all over Europe and throughout the rest of the world by Marc Sinden Productions. Internationally, it has been performed at the British Theatre Season, Monaco; the Holder's Festival, Barbados; on Guernsey (one of the Channel Islands) and is currently on an 18-month tour of Australia and New Zealand.

It is billed as: "An anthology evening of Wicked Comedy, Heavenly Drama, Devilishly Tall Tales, Enchanting Poetry and Seductive Stories starring Four Deadly Beautiful Temptresses, who will enlighten you on how to survive, or even live by, the Seven Deadly Sins!"

Cast 
Compiled from the works of nearly everyone with a sense of humour (sometimes unintentional) - from Chaucer to Victoria Wood, from Woody Allen to Oscar Wilde via Flanders & Swann, Joyce Grenfell, Steven Berkoff and Noël Coward, it stars four from the following alphabetically listed, interchangeable cast:
 Lysette Anthony
 Debbie Arnold
 Jane Asher
 Samantha Beckinsale
 Tara Blaise
 Judy Buxton
 Tracey Childs
 Sara Crowe
 Lorna Dallas
 Janie Dee
 Serena Evans
 Jan Francis
 Liza Goddard
 Anita Harris
 Sue Holderness
 Belinda Lang
 Caroline Langrishe
 Rula Lenska
 Annabel Leventon
 Cherie Lunghi
 Nichola McAuliffe
 Kerry Norton
 Eva Pope
 Linda Purl
 Georgia Reece
 Liz Robertson
 Twiggy
 Joanne Whalley

References 

2003 plays
Comedy plays
Literature about literature
Plays by Norman Hudis
Plays by Marc Sinden
Seven deadly sins in popular culture